Borja Navarro García (born 14 May 1990) was a Spanish footballer who plays for Caudal Deportivo as a forward.

Football career
Born in Gijón, Asturias, Navarro played youth football with local giants Sporting de Gijón. In November 2008, still a junior, he began appearing professionally with the B-team in Segunda División B.

Navarro made his main squad – and La Liga – debut on 7 February 2010, playing the last 13 minutes in a 1–3 away loss against UD Almería. After being released by Sporting he resumed his career in the third level, representing SD Lemona, CD Guijuelo, Caudal Deportivo and Albacete Balompié. With the latter he achieved promotion to Segunda División, appearing in 13 matches and scoring once.

On 19 August 2014 Navarro was loaned to SD Compostela, in the third level. On 3 August of the following year he moved abroad, joining Thai Division 1 League club Pattaya United F.C.

References

External links

1990 births
Living people
Footballers from Gijón
Spanish footballers
Association football forwards
La Liga players
Segunda División B players
Sporting de Gijón B players
Sporting de Gijón players
SD Lemona footballers
CD Guijuelo footballers
Albacete Balompié players
SD Compostela footballers
UD Almería B players
Caudal Deportivo footballers
Borja Navarro
Spanish expatriate footballers
Spanish expatriate sportspeople in Thailand
Expatriate footballers in Thailand